Phyllosticta arachidis-hypogaeae is a fungal plant pathogen infecting peanuts.

References

External links
 USDA ARS Fungal Database

Fungal plant pathogens and diseases
Peanut diseases
arachidis-hypogaeae
Fungi described in 1963